Central University of Finance and Economics (CUFE), is a national public research university located in Beijing, China.

Central University of Finance and Economics is the first economics and management university which was founded by the China Central Government and now under the direct administration of the Ministry of Education of China. The university is a national key university with subjects in economics, management, law, literature, philosophy, science, engineering, pedagogy and art.

Central University of Finance and Economics is a Double First Class University Plan university, also a member of former Project 211 and the 985 Innovative Platforms for Key Disciplines Project, which receives support from the Ministry of Education, the Ministry of Finance and the Beijing Government. 

Central University of Finance and Economics has been regarded as one of the prominent universities in finance, economics, business and management of China, which is known as "the Cradle of Giants in the Fields of Finance and Management". In The Report of Chinese Universities and Courses evaluation of 2017–2018 (released by Research Center for China Science Evaluation), Central University of Finance and Economics was ranked No.1 among 67 finance and economics universities in mainland China. According to 2018 China College Rankings By Salary, the average salaries of CUFE graduates is ranked No.9 in China. In the Assessments of Ministry of Education, the Applied Economics of CUFE is ranked as No. 1 in China, accompanying with the Peking University and the Renmin University of China.

History 
In 1949, shortly after the founding of the People's Republic of China, CUFE (then called Central School of Taxation), the first university of finance and economics in the Republic, was created by the China Central Government.

In 1952, the faculties and staffs of economics of the Peking University, the Tsinghua University, the Yenching University, the Fu Jen Catholic University are merged into CUFE.

The former name of CUFE was Central School of Taxation. Later, it went through several stages of development, from Central Institute of Finance, Central Institute of Finance and Economics, to Central Institute of Finance and Banking.

In 1996, the institute was officially renamed as Central University of Finance and Economics (CUFE) under the direct leadership of the Ministry of Education. CUFE upholds "loyalty, unity, truth and innovation" as its motto, adhering to the philosophy of "pursuing truth and excellence". With over 125,000 graduates, CUFE is known as "the Cradle of Giants in the Field of Finance and Management ".

In 1999, the Communist Party former general secretary, Jiang Zemin, gave CUFE his autograph to celebrate the 50th birthday of the university.

Key disciplinary areas 
World-class Discipline honored by the Ministry of Education: Applied Economics, which includes National Economics, Regional Economics, Public Finance, Finance, Industrial Economics, International Trade, Labor Economics, Statistics, Quantitative Economics, Defense Economics, Governmental Economics and Management, Investment, Media Economics, Insurance, Actuarial Science, Security Investment, International Finance, Financial Engineering, Taxation.

National Key Disciplines honored by the Ministry of Education: Applied Economics, National Economics, Regional Economics, Public Finance, Finance, Industrial Economics, International Trade, Labor Economics, Statistics, Quantitative Economics, Defense Economics, Accounting.

Municipal Key Disciplines honored by the Beijing Government: Business Administration, Statistics, Political Economics, World Economics, Chinese Marxism, Economic Information Management, Management of Multinational Company

Key Research Base of the Ministry of Education: China Institute of Actuarial Science

Organization 
Central University of Finance and Economics has four campuses in Beijing (Civil Campus, Shahe Campus, Qinghe Campus and Xishan Campus) and operates 38 correspondence centers in 18 provinces, municipalities and autonomous regions across China.  The schools, centers, institutes and academies of CUFE are listed below.

Schools 
School of Public Finance and Tax
School of Finance
School of Accountancy
School of Insurance
School of Statistics and Mathematics
School of International Trade and Economics
School of Economics
Business School
School of Management Science and Engineering
School of Government
School of Sport Economics and Management
Law School
School of Sociology and Psychology
School of Marxism
School of Culture and Communication
School of Foreign Studies
School of Information

Institutes 
Institute for Finance and Economics Research
Institute of Defense Economics and Management
International Institute of Green Finance

Centers 
Center for China Fiscal Development
China Center for Human Capital and Labor Market Research

Academies 
China Economics and Management Academy
Chinese Academy of Finance and Development
China Academy of Public Finance and Public Policy

Faculty and staff 
As of September 2017, Central University of Finance and Economics has 1,759 faculty and staff (1178 full-time teachers). Among full-time teachers, there are 293 professors, 451 associate professors and 434 assistant professors and lecturers.

In the recent three years (2015–2017), the newly hired faculty members of CUFE are mainly graduated from world-renowned universities, such as

North America: UCLA, UC Riverside, UC Davis, Wharton School, Cornell University, Brown University, UIUC, University of Virginia, Boston University, Georgetown University, Emory University, University of Lowa, Queen's University, University of Alberta, University of Waterloo

Europe: Leiden University, University of Rome La Sapienza, University of Rome Tor Vergata, University of London, University of Edinburgh, University of Nottingham, University of Hamburg, University of Bonn, Vrije Universiteit Amsterdam

Asia: National University of Singapore, Singapore Management University

China: University of Hong Kong, Hong Kong University of Science and Technology, Chinese University of Hong Kong, Chinese Academy of Sciences, Chinese Academy of Social Sciences, Peking University, Tsinghua University, Renmin University of China, Fudan University, Shanghai Jiao Tong University

Students 
Currently there are 16,258 students registered at Central University of Finance and Economics, including 10,123 undergraduates, 5,358 masters, 777 PhD candidates.

CUFE has trained more than 125,000 experts in economics and management who have made, and continue to make, significant contributions to the development of China. Many CUFE alumni hold key positions in government, such as the vice premier of the Central Government, the minister of finance, the central bank governor.

In the recent three years (2015–2017), more than 50% of the undergraduate students of CUFE will pursuit a master's or doctoral degree after graduation. They mainly go to the universities listed below.

North America: MIT, Stanford University, Yale University, University of Chicago, Columbia University, University of California Berkeley, University of Pennsylvania, Johns Hopkins University, New York University, UIUC, Duke University, Washington University in St Louis, Cornell University, Carnegie Mellon University, UC San Diego, University of Washington, University of Wisconsin-Madison, Northwestern University, University of Michigan-Ann Arbor, University of California-Los Angeles, University of Texas at Austin, Georgia Institute of Technology, UC Santa Barbara, University of Toronto, University of Waterloo

Europe: University of Oxford, Imperial College London, London School of Economics and Political Science, University College London, London Business School, University of Edinburgh, King's College London, University of Manchester, HEC Paris

Asia and Oceania: National University of Singapore, Nanyang Technological University, Singapore Management University, University of Melbourne, Australian National University, University of Tokyo, Seoul National University

China: University of Hong Kong, Hong Kong University of Science and Technology, Chinese University of Hong Kong, Central University of Finance and Economics, Renmin University of China, Peking University, Tsinghua University, Fudan University, Chinese Academy of Social Sciences, Chinese Academy of Sciences, Shanghai Jiao Tong University, University of Science and Technology of China, Zhejiang University, Nanjing University.

Rankings and reputation 
Central University of Finance and Economics has been regarded as the best university in finance, economics, business and management of China, which is known as "the Cradle of Giants in the Fields of Finance and Management". In The Report of Chinese Universities and Courses evaluation of 2017–2018 (released by Research Center for China Science Evaluation), Central University of Finance and Economics was ranked No.1 among 67 finance and economics universities in mainland China. According to 2018 China College Rankings By Salary, the average salaries of CUFE graduates is ranked No.9 in China. In the Assessments of Ministry of Education, the Applied Economics of CUFE is ranked as No. 1 in China, accompanying with the Peking University and the Renmin University of China.

As of 2022, Central University of Finance and Economics ranked the best in Beijing and 2nd nationwide among universities specialized in finance, business, and economics in the recognized Best Chinese Universities Ranking.  CUFE ranks in the global top # 76 in "Finance", top # 201 in "Economics", top # 301 in "Business Administration", and top # 401 in "Management" by the Academic Ranking of World Universities (ARWU) by Subjects. The U.S. News & World Report Best Global University Ranking ranked CUFE at #201 globally and 25th in Asia in "Economics and Business" subject.

Distinguished alumni

International cooperation 
As of 2017, Central University of Finance and Economics has cooperation with 126 universities, governments, international organizations and companies abroad.

Started in 2006, asked to help the China's Central Government, CUFE has trained thousands of senior administration officials from 91 developing countries.

CUFE has cooperation with many universities all over the world, such as University of Waterloo, University of Birmingham, Tilburg University, Stevens Institute of Technology, Victoria University, Academy of Finance of the Russian Federation, St. Petersburg State Economic University, Ukraine Kiev National University of Economics, Chung-Ang University, Tunghai University, Ming Chuan University, Kyungnam University, Soochow University, University of Pernambuco.

CUFE has cooperation with international organizations as well, such as the Institute and Faculty of Actuaries (IFoA), the Chartered Insurance Institute, the Australian and New Zealand Institute of Insurance and Finance.

CUFE also has many cooperations with some international companies, such as Zurich Financial Services Group, AXA, National Union Life and Limb Insurance Company.

In 2013, CUFE has launched a Confucius Institute in the University of Pernambuco, Brazil.

Courses

Grades

References

External links

 Central University of Finance and Economics Official Website
 Research for China Science Evaluation Official Website

 
Business schools in China
Educational institutions established in 1949
Universities and colleges in Beijing
1949 establishments in China
Plan 111
Universities and colleges in Haidian District